Giannis Papadopoulos (born 9 March 1989) is a Greek professional footballer who last played as a midfielder for Iraklis.

He was the captain of the Greece Under-19 team. He plays in a central midfield role predominantly, although he is capable of playing as a left midfielder and also as an attacking midfielder.

Club career

Iraklis
Papadopoulos started out his career at Iraklis as a trainee. His second season was a very impressive one, catching the eye of major Greek teams in 2007–08, which eventually earned him a move to Olympiacos on 3 June 2008. The transfer fee was thought to be around 800,000 Euros. Papadopoulos is left-footed, and his main strength is his powerful shot which he uses to great effect by often shooting from long distances.

Olympiacos
On 5 October 2008, Papadopoulos became a man as he made his Olympiakos debut as a substitute for teammate Dudu Cearense against city rivals AEK Athens. He impressed, having played a creative role in the second goal of Olympiakos' 2–0 win. After he had terminated his contract with Olympiacos in July 2011, he switched to Dynamo Dresden.

Dynamo Dresden
On 12 August 2011 he debuted with the club in a victorious 4–0 home win against Union Berlin. His first year in 2. Bundesliga was an impressive one having 24 appearances, 15 as a starter. Unfortunately the period 2012/13 was mostly a substitute, therefore after he had terminated his contract with Dynamo Dresden in July 2013, he signed a 1-year contract with Aris, returning to Super League.

Aris
He made his debut with the club on 18 August in an away loss from Apollon Smyrni.
On 2 March 2014 Papadopoulos terminates his contract with the club, signing with the Polish club Cracovia. There will have the opportunity to find a mate from Greek Super League,the former Croatian central defender of Panthrakikos Tomislav Mikulic. " Aris F.C. announces the termination of cooperation with the footballer Yannis Papadopoulos. The management team would like to thank the 24 years' old for his contribution and wishes him continued success in his career" said the announcement of the club. Papadopoulos had informed his coach Soulis Papadopoulos for his intention to leave the club due to serious economic problems and that was the reason that was not among the starting XI in the home game against OFI.

Cracovia
On 1 March 2014 he signed a one and a half-year contract with the Polish club Cracovia. He made his debut with the club on March, 17 in a 1–0 home win against Jagiellonia Białystok and a week later he scored the only goal in a 1–1 away draw against Podbeskidzie Bielsko-Biała. At the end of the 2013/14 season Cracovia announced the end of cooperation with the Greek midfielder due to financial disagreements.

Career in Israel
On 11 July 2014, Papadopoulos signed a one-year contract with the Israeli football club Bnei Sakhnin F.C. playing for Israeli Premier League. In February 2015, he signed for the rest of the season with the Israeli club Hapoel Acre.

During this period Hapoel Acre began to show a different face making a championship rally, as in the next nine games, managed to lose only from Hapoel Tel Aviv counting 5 wins and 4 draws. Papadopoulos described as "multi-tool" from the sports press, as in addition to defensive midfielder role in the game, he could play both as central back as well as an attacking midfielder, and with his goals helped his team in that achievement. As a result of this outstanding performance one of the biggest sports' sites in the country («sports.walla») indicate that his acquisition was crucial for the club, a fact that is also acknowledged from the team coach, Shlomi Dora, who in an interview he gave on the same site asked what were the five key moments of the year and of course stated that the acquisition of the Papadopoulos is one of them. "I had seen Yiannis several times at Bnei Sakhnin F.C. and I think he is an excellent player, so when his contract expired, we moved immediately for his acquisition and we have not been disappointed"  he said among others.

On 16 July 2015 signed to Hapoel Kfar Saba On 20 December 2015, he scored his first goal in the season, helping his club to escape with a 1–1 draw against Maccabi Haifa. On 30 April 2016, he scored with an incredible left kick in a 2–1 home win against Ironi Kiryat Shmona.

Veria
On 2 August 2016, he signed a year contract with Greek club Veria for an undisclosed fee, returning in Superleague after 2,5 years.

Nea Salamina
On 21 June 2017, he signed a two years contract with Cypriot club Nea Salamina for an undisclosed fee.

Iraklis
On 28 July 2018, newly promoted side Iraklis announced the signing of Papadopoulos.

Rodos
In January 2020, Papadopoulos moved to Rodos FC.

International career
He was member of Greece U21 and Captain of Greece U19.
On 29 May he demonstrated this capability by scoring a 30-yard shot against Russia for the Greece U19 team.

Personal life
Papadopoulos is the son of Iraklis all-time leader in appearances Daniil Papadopoulos.

Honours
Olympiacos
 Greek Superleague: 2008–09, 2010–11
 Greek Cup: 2008–09

Greece
 UEFA U-19 Championship: Runners-up: 2007

References

External links
 
 
 

1989 births
Living people
Greek footballers
Greek expatriate footballers
Iraklis Thessaloniki F.C. players
Olympiacos F.C. players
Dynamo Dresden players
Aris Thessaloniki F.C. players
Bnei Sakhnin F.C. players
Hapoel Acre F.C. players
Hapoel Kfar Saba F.C. players
Veria F.C. players
MKS Cracovia (football) players
Nea Salamis Famagusta FC players
Digenis Akritas Morphou FC players
Rodos F.C. players
Super League Greece players
2. Bundesliga players
Israeli Premier League players
Greek expatriate sportspeople in Germany
Greek expatriate sportspeople in Israel
Greek expatriate sportspeople in Poland
Expatriate footballers in Germany
Expatriate footballers in Israel
Expatriate footballers in Poland
Association football midfielders
Greece youth international footballers
Greece under-21 international footballers
Greece international footballers
Footballers from Thessaloniki